The 1995–96 Kent Football League season was the 30th in the history of the Kent Football League, a football competition in England.

The league was won by Furness, while Dartford returned to the Southern Football League after three seasons in the Kent League.

League table

The league featured 19 clubs which competed in the previous season, along with one new club:
Hythe United, joined from the Kent County League

League table

References

External links

1995-96
1995–96 in English football leagues